John Gibbons is an Irish environmental campaigner and the founder of the climatechange.ie website. He also co-founded the healthcare publishing and communications specialists MedMedia Group.

Journalism
For two years Gibbons contributed a weekly column to The Irish Times, analysing aspects of climate change and sustainability.  The newspaper dropped the column in February 2010, although it continued to publish articles by Gibbons. His work has also appeared in 'The Guardian' and Sunday Tribune.

Criticisms of Irish response to environmental problems
Citing evidence that global media coverage of climate change in 2010 fell to levels not seen since 2005, Gibbons argues that there is a similar trend in Ireland. He accuses Irish newspapers and Raidió Teilifís Éireann (RTÉ) of "giving too much coverage to 'anti-science' climate change deniers and failing to convey the gravity of the threat, making readers and viewers apathetic". In particular he has been critical of the stance taken on the issue of global warming by broadcaster Pat Kenny.

Gibbons has argued that global economic recovery will be constrained by energy shortages, and he points out that the Irish economy, with its relatively high per capita use of energy, is particularly vulnerable to "peak oil", the anticipated decline in global oil production.

See also
 Individual and political action on climate change

Notes

External links
 Climatechange.ie Website
 thinkorswim Climatechange.ie blog

Year of birth missing (living people)
Living people
Climate activists
Irish columnists
Irish environmentalists
21st-century Irish male writers
Irish male non-fiction writers
Non-fiction environmental writers
Sunday Tribune people
Sustainability advocates
The Irish Times people
21st-century Irish non-fiction writers